John George Crncich (February 8, 1925 – October 27, 2019) was a Grey Cup champion Canadian Football League player. He played offensive center.

A native Croatian, Crncich played football with Thomas D'Arcy McGee High School, and later attended McGill University, both in Montreal. He won the Grey Cup with the champion St. Hyacinthe-Donnacona Navy team in 1944. He was a player with the Montreal Hornets and in 1946 played one game with the Toronto Argonauts.  He finished  his football career playing 2 seasons for the Sarnia Imperials. He died on October 27, 2019.

References

1925 births
People from Primorje-Gorski Kotar County
Toronto Argonauts players
McGill Redbirds football players
McGill University alumni
Ontario Rugby Football Union players
Croatian emigrants to Canada
2019 deaths
St. Hyacinthe-Donnacona Navy football players
Yugoslav emigrants to Canada